Bolman is a settlement in the region of Baranja, Croatia. Administratively, it is located in the Jagodnjak municipality within the Osijek-Baranja County. Population is 450 people.

History
From March 6 till March 24, 1945, during World War II, near Bolman was waged battle between Yugoslav Army and Red Army on one side and German army on the other side.

Demographics

1991

Serbs: 586 (79,08%)
Croats: 86 (11,60%)
Yugoslavs: 33 (4,45%)
Hungarians: 5 (0,67%)
Others, unknown: 31 (4,18%)

See also

Jagodnjak Municipality
Osijek-Baranja county
Baranja
Church of St. Peter and Paul

References

Populated places in Osijek-Baranja County
Baranya (region)
Joint Council of Municipalities
Serb communities in Croatia